The Armada gas field complex is a group of natural gas fields located in the Central North Sea  NE of Aberdeen, within the United Kingdom Continental Shelf. The field was operated by BG Group and is now operated by Shell. The Fleming and Hawkins fields were discovered in 1980 and the Drake and Seymour Fields in 1982. Development approval was granted in 1994 and production started in 1997. The gas is exported via the Central Area Transmission System through a link to the Everest gasfield. Oil is exported via the Forties oil field to Grangemouth.

Fields

All fields are named after British sailors who fought the Spanish Armada. And are developed via a single platform which was installed in 1997. Export capacity is 28,000 barrels of oil and 10.76 MM cubic metres per day

 Fleming - this field has a Palaeocene Maureen Formation turbidite sandstone reservoir pinching out to the east. It is developed via 6 extended reach wells.
 Drake - This field has a Jurassic Ula Formation sandstone reservoir and is developed via two production wells.
 Hawkins - This field has a Jurassic sandstone reservoir and is developed via a single well.
 Seymour - SW Seymour has a Jurassic reservoir and is developed via a single well  from the platform. NW Seymour is an oilfield developed via a single sub-sea well.

The Maria Field, located in adjacent UKCS block 16/29 a is developed via a sub-sea manifold tied back to the Armada Platform. The Gaupe and Rev fields in an adjacent Norwegian blocks were also tied back as a sub sea development to Armada. 

The fields are scheduled to be decommissioned at the end of 2017

Ownership

Armada had a complex ownership history being located over 4 north sea blocks (16/29a, 22/5b, 22/4a and 22/5a). It was one of the first UKCS fields with a fixed equity unitisation agreement. Original equity owners were Amoco, British Gas, Hess, ENI, Phillips Petroleum and Fina. There have been a series of complex asset sales and swaps.

in 2017 ownership was:

 Shell (ex BG Group) - 76.42%
 Centrica            - 23.58 %

Shell are in the process of selling the Armada complex together with other UKCS assets to Chrysaor ltd

References

BG Group Page
DECC data page
I.A. Stuart The Armada development  in United Kingdom oil and gas fields: commemorative millennium volume , Jon G. Gluyas, H. M. Hichens
DTI brown book from 2001
 - Shell fact sheet from 2017

Natural gas fields in the United Kingdom
Oil and gas industry in Scotland
North Sea energy